Parghelia is a comune (municipality) in the Province of Vibo Valentia in the Italian region Calabria, located about  southwest of Catanzaro and about  west of Vibo Valentia.

The municipality of Parghelia contains the frazione (subdivision) Fìtili.

Parghelia borders the following municipalities: Drapia, Tropea, Zaccanopoli, Zambrone.

Parghelia is one of the cities that belongs to the Coast of the Gods.

Demographic evolution

Gallery

Notable People 
Albert Anastasia, Former boss of the Gambino Crime Family

References 

Proloco Parghelia
Parghelia's Portal (Parghelia85.net)

Cities and towns in Calabria